The Adventures of Hercules is the 1985 sequel to the 1983 film Hercules. It was written and directed by Luigi Cozzi and has bodybuilder-turned-actor Lou Ferrigno reprising his role as the title character.

Summary
The film opens explaining the story of Zeus' Seven Mighty Thunderbolts that kept peace. One day, other vengeful gods (Aphrodite, Hera, Poseidon, and Flora) stole these lightning bolts to create chaos. The lack of these thunderbolts has rendered Zeus powerless and sent the Moon on a collision course with the Earth. As the humans on Earth begin to suffer, two sisters named Urania and Glaucia speak to the Little People and learn that only Hercules can save them now. After hesitation, Zeus finally decides to send Hercules back from the stars to Earth to aid the humans, but the vengeful gods resurrect their own warrior: King Minos. They believe that King Minos, with the help of Dedalos can defeat Zeus with science. Thus begins Hercules' quest to find the Seven Mighty Thunderbolts, which are hidden inside monsters across the Universe.

Firstly, Hercules fights and defeats an apelike creature and retrieves the first thunderbolt. Meanwhile, the four gods resurrect King Minos, Hercules also teams up with Glaucia and rescues her sister Urania from hideous monsters called the Slime People. They are overwhelmed by their huge numbers and they flee into a cave where they meet Euryale. The cave is full of stone statues and Hercules and the sisters battle some more monsters, while Euryale walks away and reveals herself to be a snake-haired, half-woman, half-scorpion Gorgon. Using his shield as a mirror, Hercules avoids getting turned into stone and manages to decapitate Euryale, and retrieves the second thunderbolt.

Hercules and the two sisters sail to an island and enter an old, haunted forest with strange human dolls hanging from the trees. He is then attacked by a demonic sorcerer-knight, but Hercules overwhelms the knight and impales him onto a poisonous thorn branch, revealing the third thunderbolt. Glaucia is captured by a high priest's soldiers to be sacrificed to the deadly fire monster Antaeus, Urania then rescues her while Hercules battles Antaeus, summoned by the priest, and defeats him by throwing around the Earth until he crashes into the sea, also revealing the fourth thunderbolt.

Hercules and Glaucia then battle some Amazon warriors but he is captured by them, Urania wakes Hercules up and he strangles their leader Arachne, the Queen of the Spiders, whose body contained the fifth thunderbolt. The three travel up in space where Urania reveals the location of the sixth thunderbolt, that was inside a rock. Glaucia tries to kill Urania, Minos appears and reveals that when both Hercules and Urania had lost Glaucia, he commanded Poseidon to use the waters to drain her life. Hercules battles Minos who transforms into a dinosaur while Hercules transforms into a gorilla and manages to destroy Minos once and for all.

The warrior finally deals with the Earth and the Moon problem, as, with Zeus' help, he grows as big as the galaxy and stops them from colliding into each other, putting the Moon back in its proper place. Urania then reveals that, with information she received earlier from the Little People, she is the daughter of Hera and that her body contains the seventh thunderbolt, decides to sacrifice her life so Zeus can retrieve the thunderbolt, and does so, by allowing Hera to give her the "kiss of death". Both Hercules and Urania are honored by Zeus, become gods and are able to live with them.

Cast

Production
The Adventures of Hercules was shot in Rome at Incir de Paolis Studios.

Release
The Adventures of Hercules was released in Italy on May 2, 1985 and in the United States on October 4, 1985. Alternative English-language titles for the film include The Adventures of Hercules II and The New Adventures of Hercules.

Reception
Howard Hughes discussed the film in his book Cinema Italiano, noting that it shares stock footage from the original film but is not as entertaining. The review noted the visuals and film score would "induce migraines". Andy Brack of Charleston City Paper named The Adventures of Hercules his "favorite Ferrigno film".

References

Sources

External links
 
 
 

1985 films
1980s fantasy adventure films
American sequel films
Italian sequel films
Films about Heracles
Films scored by Pino Donaggio
Golan-Globus films
Peplum films
Sword and sandal films
Films directed by Luigi Cozzi
Films produced by Menahem Golan
Resurrection in film
Films set in forests
Films shot in Rome
Films produced by Yoram Globus
1980s Italian films